Tristramella intermedia is an extinct species of fish in the family Cichlidae. It was endemic to Lake Hula in northern Israel.  This taxon was considered to be a subspecies of T. simonis in FishBase and considered a synonym of T. simonis by Catalog of Fishes, a view with which FishBase now concurs. This species reached a length of  TL.

The deliberate draining of Lake Hula in the 1950s led to the extinction of this species, along with the cyprinid fish Acanthobrama hulensis.

See also
 List of extinct animals of Asia

References

Endemic fauna of Israel
Fish of Israel
Fish described in 1953
Fish extinctions since 1500
Species made extinct by human activities
Intermedia
Taxonomy articles created by Polbot
Hula Valley
Taxa named by Heinz Steinitz